Optiva Inc. (formerly Redknee Solutions, Inc.) is a Canadian provider of Business support system and Operations Support Systems software and services to the telecommunications industry.

History
Optiva was founded in 1999 as Redknee Solutions by then CEO, Lucas Skoczkowski, and four other co-founders. The company expanded into Europe in 2000 and opened R&D facilities in Pune, India in 2004. It was later listed on the London AIM Index in 2007 and on the Toronto Stock Exchange in 2008.

In 2017 ESW Capital took control of the company, removing the CEO, Lucas Skoczkowski, and replacing him with Danielle Royston from ESW Capital. 
 Redknee Solutions was then rebranded as Optiva on Jan 16, 2018.  The rebranding effort was completed on April 5, 2018.

In July 2020, Optiva made the decision to redeem its preferred shares. As a result, ESW lost control of the company, and Danielle Royston resigned as CEO. In August, at the annual and special meeting, the shareholders approved to ratify the adoption of the company's shareholder rights plan and to approve the unallocated options available under the company's stock option plan.

In December 2020, John Giere was named President and CEO of Optiva.

Acquisitions
Optiva grew substantially by acquisition. 
 2007 - Argent Networks for $4 million 
 2010 - Nimbus Systems for an undisclosed amount
 2013 - Nokia Siemens Networks BSS division for $52 million
 2015 - Orga Systems for EUR38 million

Products
Optiva provides BSS and OSS software and services to the telecommunications industry. These include rating and charging, converged billing, customer experience management, interconnect billing and customer care. Its products address wireless, fixed line, satellite, WiMAX, MVNO and broadband providers across the Americas, Europe, Asia Pacific, the Middle East and Africa.

References

1999 establishments in Ontario
Canadian companies established in 1999
Companies based in Toronto
Companies listed on the Toronto Stock Exchange
Telecommunications companies of Canada